4x4 Off-Road Racing is a video game of the racing genre released in 1988 by Epyx and developed by Ogdan Micro Design Inc. The four maps consist of Mud, Ice, Desert and Mountains.

Reception 

Compute! called the game "an enjoyable drive".

The Spanish magazine Microhobby valued the game with the following scores: Originality: 50% Graphics: 50% Motion: 60% Sound: 50% Difficulty: 70% Addiction: 40%

References

External links 
 4x4 Off-Road Racing at MobyGames
 

1988 video games
Amiga games
Amstrad CPC games
Atari ST games
Commodore 64 games
DOS games
Epyx games
MSX games
Off-road racing video games
Racing video games
U.S. Gold games
Video games developed in the United States
ZX Spectrum games
Single-player video games